Šimonytė Cabinet is the 18th cabinet of Lithuania since 1990. It consists of the current Prime Minister Ingrida Šimonytė who is the Head of Government, and 14 government ministers from the Homeland Union – Lithuanian Christian Democrats, Liberal Movement of the Republic of Lithuania, Freedom Party.

History 
During the night of the second round of the 2020 Lithuanian parliamentary election, once most of the results were counted, it was announced about the probable formation of the center-right coalition between Homeland Union, Liberal Movement and the Freedom Party. It was announced on November 9 that the center-right parties successfully signed a coalition agreement and the 18th cabinet of Lithuania will be led by Homeland Union nominee-Independent candidate Šimonytė.

On 24 November, Šimonytė was nominated as the Prime Minister by the Seimas and her cabinet was appointed by the president on 7 December. On 11 December, the Government program was approved, thus, the cabinet officially took office.

Cabinet  
On November 18, Prime Minister Ingrida Šimonytė announced her preliminary cabinet which will consist of 2 ministers delegated by Liberal Movement, 3 ministers delegated by Freedom Party and 9 ministers delegated by the Homeland Union.

Almost half of the ministers, together with Šimonytė herself, are women.

Premiership of Ingrida Šimonytė

Domestic policy

COVID-19 pandemic

The government of Saulius Skvernelis held its last meeting on 9 December 2020, before the new cabinet is expected to assume office on Friday. Then, PM-designate Šimonytė urged the outgoing government to step up coronavirus measures.

Šimonytė's cabinet was sworn in and started working on 11 December 2020, when the number of cases reached 3067. Two days later, restrictions were put in place.

The vaccination program began on 27 December 2020, as in the rest of the European Union. The first to receive the vaccine were healthcare professionals working with COVID-19 patients.

On 4 January, Lithuanian government confirmed backlog of 293 deaths that were previously unaccounted in statistic.

From 15 February, partial lifting of lockdown was made, including decision to re-open small shops and beauty salons. Later, wearing face masks no longer required outdoors.

On 17 March Health Minister Arūnas Dulkys suspended the use of vaccine produced by British-Swedish company AstraZeneca. On 18 March the European Medicines Agency said the AstraZeneca vaccine is safe. On 22 March 2021, Šimonytė, Speaker of the Seimas Viktorija Čmilytė-Nielsen, and Health Minister Arūnas Dulkys also received the same vaccine.

Portfolio of strategic works (projects)
Based on the priority works of the Government's program, the portfolio of the Prime Minister's strategic projects has been compiled. The following five strategic works (projects) have been published in the Prime Minister's portfolio of strategic works (projects) as part of the reforms of the government term:

restructurization of the civil service;
educational program "Millennium Schools";
EDtech digital transformation of education;
creation of innovation ecosystems in science centers, innovation agencies and mission-based science and business innovation programs;
creation of a long-term care service delivery model.

The Prime Minister's portfolio of strategic works (projects) also includes the commitment of the implementation plan of the Eighteenth Government Program to prepare the State Progress Strategy "Lithuania 2050" and seven more strategic works (projects) of public management, education and strategic infrastructure:

Review of functions and optimal network of institutions (public management system).
Public and administrative services (including their quality assurance in the regions).
Financial planning of the government sector is oriented towards strategic goals.
Sustainable interaction between culture and education (inclusion of culture and creativity in education).
An effective system for increasing resilience to threats, crisis and emergency management.
Secure electrical energy system (synchronization of the electrical energy system with the West and the blockade of the Astravo nuclear power plant).
Development of strategic rail and road transport connections.

Foreign policy

Baltic States
On 1 January 2021, Šimonytė took over the presidency of the Baltic Council of Ministers for a term of one year.

Belarus
During the meeting with Sviatlana Tsikhanouskaya, Šimonytė emphasized that Lithuania seeks to further increase pressure on the Belarusian regime. Lithuania also supports the expansion of EU sanctions. During the meeting, the prime minister said:

<...> Release of political prisoners, end of repression, and free and democratic elections are the key steps that Belarusians are demanding. Lithuania and the entire democratic world demand the same.

References

External links 
 Website of the Government of the Republic of Lithuania

Cabinet of Lithuania
2020 establishments in Lithuania
Cabinets established in 2020
Current governments
Ingrida Šimonytė